Stathmopoda biclavis is a species of moth in the Stathmopodidae family. It is found in the Seychelles on Aldabra island in the Indian Ocean.

This species is close to Stathmopoda auriferella.

References
Meyrick 1911d. Tortricina and Tineina. Results of the Percy Sladen Trust Expedition to the Indian Ocean in 1905. - Transactions of the Linnean Society of London (2)14(3):263–307.

Stathmopodidae
Fauna of Seychelles
Moths described in 1911